

Population
According to INSEE the population of French Guiana was 268,700 as of January 1, 2017. The population is very young: 44% are below the age of 20, while only 1.7% are 75 years or older. The age distribution is a reflection of the high fertility rates of French Guiana.

Nationality
On January 1, 2010, 64.5% of the population had French nationality, while 35.5% had a foreign nationality. Of these, Surinamese (13.8% of the total population), Haitians (8.8%) and Brazilians (8.7%) were the largest groups. Smaller groups included people with nationality of Guyana (1.7%), Colombia (1.0%), China (0.5%), the Dominican Republic (0.4%) and Peru (0.2%).

Vital statistics
The total fertility rate in French Guiana has remained high and is today considerably higher than in metropolitan France, and also higher than the average of the French overseas departments. It is largely responsible for the high population growth of French Guiana.

Structure of the population

Structure of the population (01.01.2010) (Provisional estimates) :

Infant mortality rate
The infant mortality in French Guiana is higher than in metropolitan France:
 2007-2009: 12.0
 2008-2010: 11.6
 2009-2011: 10.1

Life expectancy
At birth, life expectancy is 76.2 years for male children, and 82.8 for female (figures for 2011).

Ethnic groups

Estimates of the percentages of French Guiana ethnic composition vary, a situation compounded by the large proportion of immigrants.

Creoles, or Mulattoes (people of mixed African and French ancestry), are the largest ethnic group, though estimates vary as to the exact percentage, depending upon whether the large Haitian community is included as well. Generally the Creole population is judged to be about 60 to 70% of the total population if Haitians (comprising roughly one-third of Creoles) are included, and 30 to 50% without.

Roughly 41,000 people or 14% of the population of French Guiana is of European ancestry. The vast majority of these are of French heritage, though there are also people of Dutch, British, Spanish and Portuguese ancestry.

The main Asian communities are the Chinese (about 3-4%, primarily from Zhejiang province in mainland China and Hong Kong) and Hmong from Laos (1-2%). There are also smaller groups from various Caribbean islands, mainly Saint Lucia as well as Dominica. Other Asian groups include East Indians, Lebanese and Vietnamese.

The main groups living in the interior are the Maroons (formerly called "Bush Negroes") who are from African descent, and Amerindians. The Maroons, descendants of escaped African slaves, live primarily along the Maroni River. The main Maroon groups are the Saramaka, Ndyuka (both of whom also live in Suriname), and Boni (Aluku). The Maroons are the fastest growing ethnic group, and as of 2018 constitute about one-third of the total population with an estimated population of close to 100,000 people.

The main Amerindian groups (estimated population about 10,000) are the Arawak, Carib, Teko (previously called Emerillon), Galibi (now called the Kaliña), Palikur, Wayampi and Wayana. The estimated population for the beginning of the 17th century was 30,000 people. Until the middle of the 20th century, there was a sharp decline in population to almost 1,200 people in 1961 which was mainly caused by European diseases. Improved health care managed to turn the tide.

Languages

French and French Guianese Creole are the most widely spoken languages. There are also several native languages, including Arawakan (Arawak and Palikúr), Cariban (Carib and Wayana), and Tupi-Guarani (Emerillon and Wayampi) languages. Other languages spoken include Hakka Chinese and Javanese.
The official language, like for all overseas departments and territories of France, is French.

Religion

The dominant religion of French Guiana is Roman Catholicism; some of the Maroons and Amerindian people maintain their own religions, however large tribes like the Kalina, Ndyuka have been Christianized.

References

 
Geography of French Guiana
French Guiana